Javed Ahmed (born 10 February 1960) is a Pakistani American businessman. He was the chief executive (CEO) of Tate & Lyle plc from 2009 to 2018.

Early life 
Ahmed graduated from Williams College, Williamstown, Massachusetts, in 1982, and received an MBA from Stanford Graduate School of Business in 1984.

Career 
He started his career with Procter & Gamble, then spent five years with Bain & Co in London and Boston, before joining Reckitt Benckiser, where he worked for 17 years.

Ahmed became CEO of Tate & Lyle in October 2009, replacing Iain Ferguson. In January 2018, the retirement of Ahmed, effective from 1 April 2018 was announced, and chief financial officer Nick Hampton was named CEO-designate.

In December 2018 it was announced that Ahmed would become a non-executive director of CF Industries.

Personal life 
He is married to wife, Talat.

Notes 

Living people
1960 births
American people of Pakistani descent
American food industry business executives
Williams College alumni
Stanford Graduate School of Business alumni
Bain & Company employees
American chief executives of food industry companies
Tate & Lyle people